Aldred is both a given name and a surname. Notable people with the name include:

 Aldred or Ealdred, archbishop of York of the 11th century
 Aldred of Lindisfarne, 10th-century Northumbrian bishop
 Aldred the Scribe, 10th-century glossator
 Aldred Lumley, 10th Earl of Scarbrough, British peer and soldier

Surname:
 Anna Lee Aldred (1921–2006), first American woman to be granted a jockey's license
 Cyril Aldred (1914–1991), British Egyptologist, art historian and author
 Duncan Aldred (born 1970), American motor industry executive
 Graeme Aldred (1966–1987), English footballer
 Guy Aldred (1886–1963), British anarchist communist and publisher
 John Aldred (disambiguation), several people
 Ken Aldred (1945–2016), Australian politician
 Mark Aldred (born 1987), British rower
 Michael Aldred (1945–1995), English record producer
 Paul Aldred (born 1969), English cricketer
 Scott Aldred (born 1968), American baseball player
 Simon Aldred, British musician of the band Cherry Ghost
 Sophie Aldred (born 1962), English actress
 Thomas Aldred (disambiguation), several people

See also
 Aldred's Case
 Aldred-Rogers Broadcasting
 Ealdred